Microsoft Autofill is a password manager developed by Microsoft. It supports multiple platforms such as Android, iOS, and Google Chrome browser. It is a part of the Microsoft Authenticator app in Android and iOS, and a browser extension on the Google Chrome. It stores users' passwords under the user's Microsoft Account. It can import passwords from Chrome and some popular password managers, or from a CSV file. In a Microsoft Authenticator app, it requires multi-factor authentication to sign in which provides an additional layer of security. The passwords are encrypted both on the device and on the cloud.

Features 
 Multi-factor authentication (through Microsoft Authenticator mobile app)
 Import from competitors
 Export to CSV file
 Save credit card information

Security 
The Microsoft Authenticator app requires biometric or device passcode as extra security. The passwords on the device are encrypted, and encryption/decryption keys are not stored and are always generated when needed. Passwords are decrypted only when a user wants to see the password or the password is filled out automatically. Passwords are synced over an SSL-protected HTTPS connection.

See also 
 Autofill

References

External links 
 Chrome Web Store

Password managers
Cryptographic software
2021 software
Google Chrome extensions
Proprietary cross-platform software